Carachupa (Quechua for opossum) is an archaeological site with rock art in Peru. It is located near the village of Carachupa, in Lonya Grande District, region of Amazonas.

See also 
 Kuntur Puna

References 

Archaeological sites in Peru
Archaeological sites in Amazonas Region
Rock art in South America
Populated places in the Amazonas Region